Cheryl McPherson (born November 10, 1963) is a Canadian curler.

She began curling at age 10.

Awards
STOH All-Star Team:

Teams and events

Women's

Mixed

References

External links
 
 Cheryl McPherson – Curling Canada Stats Archive
 Member Spotlight – Cheryl McPherson | Bayview Golf & CC

Living people
1963 births
Curlers from Toronto
Canadian women curlers
Canadian women's curling champions
Canada Cup (curling) participants